Miroslav Varga (born 21 September 1960 in Žatec) is a sport shooter and Olympic champion for Czechoslovakia. He won a gold medal in the 50 metre rifle prone event at the 1988 Summer Olympics in Seoul.

He represented the Czech Republic at the 2008 Olympics in Beijing.

References

1960 births
Living people
People from Žatec
Czechoslovak male sport shooters
Czech male sport shooters
ISSF rifle shooters
Olympic shooters of Czechoslovakia
Olympic shooters of the Czech Republic
Olympic gold medalists for Czechoslovakia
Shooters at the 1988 Summer Olympics
Shooters at the 1992 Summer Olympics
Shooters at the 2008 Summer Olympics
Olympic medalists in shooting
Medalists at the 1988 Summer Olympics
Sportspeople from the Ústí nad Labem Region